The Institute for Advanced Study of Human Sexuality (IASHS) was a private, non-accredited, for-profit graduate school and resource center for the field of sexology in San Francisco, California. It was established in 1976 and closed in 2018. Degree and certificate programs focused on public health, sex therapy, and sexological research.

The institute developed out of research in the 1960s highlighting the general lack of understanding and formal training in human sexuality. Its library and archives were a collection of adult films, academic sexological and erotological resources, and sex therapy training materials.

Like all postsecondary schools in California, IASHS was required by California law to register with the State of California Bureau for Private Postsecondary Education (BPPE), an anti-fraud, anti-diploma mill unit of the California Department of Consumer Affairs. IASHS had BPPE "approval to operate", which means that IASHS met the minimum legal standards for "offering bona fide instruction by qualified faculty". That approval was discontinued in 2014. In 2017, the institute's attempt to restart operations was denied.

History 
In 1962 a program called the National Young Adult Project (NYAP) was established by the Methodist Church. NYAP eventually evolved into an ecumenical movement that included the Evangelical United Brethren and Presbyterian Church USA denominations, as well as the United Church of Christ denomination on a national level. There were also other churches (African Methodist Episcopal, American Baptist, Lutheran Church Missouri Synod, Protestant Episcopal, United Presbyterian Church in the USA, and Lutheran Church of America) that participated on a regional or local level as well.  Ted McIlvenna headed the San Francisco project for the NYAP and was also a Methodist minister.  McIlvenna believed that there was a lack of research on human sexuality and an absence of demonstratedly effective training and educational methodologies. A meeting in 1967 at the Institute for Sex Research led to the formation of the National Sex Forum as part of the Glide Foundation to address this lack of needed research and training. The NYAP developed 50+ nationwide projects by 1968, but only three of those connected to McIlvenna and to Glide Memorial Methodist Church had anything to do with sexuality or issues related to sexuality.

By 1974, it was clear to the forum that a free-standing institute dedicated to the study of and education and training in the emerging field of sexology was required. They divided the work of creating the academic institute as follows: McIlvenna was to re-envision the Forum as an academic setting; Laird Sutton was tasked with establishing a graphic-resources library; Herbert Vandervoort was assigned to organize and prepare the academic work of the study team; and Marguerite Rubenstein, Loretta Haroian, and Phyllis Lyon were charged with designating the professional training standards for the new academically trained professional sexologists. Wardell Pomeroy was chosen as the first Academic Dean.

All of this effort was part of the process that resulted in the founding of the Institute for Advanced Study of Human Sexuality (IASHS). Ted McIlvenna (1932-2018), became co-founder, owner, and president of the institute. 

The institute was to be integral to the development of humanistic sexology, emphasizing experiential techniques and sexual pleasure over positivist empiricism. The culture of casual as well as clinical nudity and the inclusion of various bodywork and erotic massage techniques led to the institute being nicknamed "Hot Tub University" or "F**k U" by some critics. The inclusion of Reichian therapy and other scientifically unfounded techniques also led to criticism.

The institution was not accredited, but it was approved by the California Bureau for Private Postsecondary Education (BPPE), In July 2014, the BPPE sent a Notice to Comply to IASHS regarding several violations. In early 2016, the California Bureau for Private Postsecondary Education sent a Citation: Assessment of Fine and Order of Abatement to IASHS, for seven violations. After two months IASHS was required by CA SB1247 to seek and obtain accreditation. Two years later, the institute closed.

Academics 
Degrees offered by IASHS were a Master of Human Sexuality, Master of Public Health in Human Sexuality, and Doctor of Human Sexuality, as well as a Doctor of Education and Doctor of Philosophy degrees with a focus in sexology and erotology. The institute also offered professional certificates.

Coursework varied by degree program, but included formal academic lectures, group-based discussion, video lectures and webinars (which could be undertaken off-site as part of a distance education program), and hands-on training in therapy and bodywork. Research-based degrees included independent or directed use of the institute's extensive primary and secondary archives of sexological material.

Accreditation 
The institute was not accredited, but was approved by the California Bureau for Private Postsecondary Education (BPPE), which is not an accrediting agency.

Quackwatch identified the institute as a "Questionable Organization". In a 2014 news article about the institution, IASHS founder, Dr. Ted McIlvenna stated: "We don't take federal money and that's why we won't be accredited by the traditional state agencies. We don't want to be handcuffed as to what we can provide, say and do. We've been approached by accrediting bodies run by Mormons and Roman Catholics that wanted us to change our code of ethics to promote contraception and change our name to reflect 'family and marriage counseling' instead of sexuality. We won't do it."

Activities 
In addition to its educational and archival mission, the institute engaged in various forms of outreach, including sex education to underserved teenagers in demographic areas at high risk for pregnancy. Ted McIlvenna, president of the institute, favored a curriculum focusing on teaching teenagers techniques for "obtaining healthy, respectful relationships with their partners" rather than abstinence-only sex education. The institute produced safe sex books, videos, and assorted paraphernalia. The archives included hundreds of thousands of adult films, as well as documents tracing the development of sexology as a field of research and training, as well as educational materials. Collectively, these items comprised one of the most comprehensive sexological and erotological resource centers in the world.

IASHS established the Erotic Heritage Museum in Las Vegas (in partnership with Harry Mohney), which displayed a revolving selection of films, sculptures and other forms of art at the Erotic Heritage Museum.The museum is presently owned and managed by Harry Mohney.

The institute favored open discussions of sexuality, including such issues as oral sex, masturbation, homosexuality, BDSM, informed consent, teen sex and pregnancy, as well as sex therapy. Roger Libby, adjunct professor, sex therapist, and author of The Naked Truth About Sex: A Guide to Intelligent Sexual Choices for Teenagers and Twentysomethings, encouraged the use of extensive pre-sex discussions to set parameters and establish comfort levels for sexual engagement. 

Charles Moser, chair of IASHS Department of Sexual Medicine, has argued that paraphilias and BDSM should be removed from the Diagnostic and Statistical Manual of Mental Disorders (DSM).

Electronic Journal of Human Sexuality 
The institute published the Electronic Journal of Human Sexuality each year until its final issue in 2014. Articles were reviewed by the editorial board with supplemental review by readers.

Noted alumni 
Some of the institute's alumni include:

Limor Blockman, sex therapist, author, media personality 
Gloria Brame, sex therapist, author.
Ava Cadell, sex therapist, author, co-founder of Loveology University and Sexpert.com, an online sexuality education magazine by sexperts.
Lindsey Doe, sexology educator, host and co-creator of online video series, Sexplanations.
Betty Dodson, sex educator, author.
Amie Harwick, a Hollywood-based therapist who was previously engaged to comedian Drew Carey, and was murdered at age 38.
William R. Johnson (minister), first openly gay minister to be ordained in a historic protestant denomination, LGBT activist.
Joseph Kramer (sexologist), founder of the Body Electric School and of the profession of Sexological Bodywork.
 David Lourea, bisexual activist.
Del Martin, lesbian activist.
 Emily Morse sex educator, podcaster
 Sharon Mitchell founded the Adult Industry Medical Health Care Foundation, an organization supporting regular testing of pornographic actors for HIV and other sexually transmitted infections.
Carol Queen, founder of the Center for Sex & Culture, San Francisco.
Annie Sprinkle, sex educator.
Veronica Vera, founder of Miss Vera's Finishing School for Boys Who Want to Be Girls

See also 
 History of erotic depictions

References

External links 
 
 The Electronic Journal of Human Sexuality, published by the institute

 
1976 establishments in California
Buildings and structures in San Francisco
Educational institutions established in 1976
Sexology organizations
Sexual orientation and science
Sexuality in San Francisco
Unaccredited institutions of higher learning in California